Demos Goumenos (born 25 December 1978 in Paralimni, Cyprus) is a Cypriot football midfielder who played for Ayia Napa. He has been the captain of Enosis for many years.

External links
 

Living people
1978 births
People from Paralimni
Cypriot footballers
Association football midfielders
Cyprus international footballers
Cypriot First Division players
Enosis Neon Paralimni FC players
Ermis Aradippou FC players
Ayia Napa FC players